Villachiara is a comune in the province of Brescia, in Lombardy. Its coat of arms shows an eagle in the top half and a silver castle on red in the bottom half.

References

Cities and towns in Lombardy